Neil Roberts (born 7 April 1978) is a Welsh former professional footballer and Wales international. He is currently working as a project manager for Manchester City.

Career
Roberts started his career in 1994 when he played for Wrexham. After signing for the club as a trainee, he made his debut on 27 September 1997 during a 0–0 draw with Chesterfield before going on to score five goals in his next four games. He became an established first-team player at the Racecourse Ground, making 75 appearances and scoring 17 goals. He left Wrexham in 2000 to join Wigan Athletic, where he made 125 appearances and scoring 19 goals. He also spent time on loan at Hull City and Bradford City, scoring on his debut for the latter against Bristol City. He then made a permanent move to Doncaster Rovers in 2004.

In 2006 Roberts came back to his hometown club Wrexham, where he became the team captain. He is a Welsh international with four caps. Roberts had a good start to the 2006–07 season by scoring two goals in the first two games. These goals were very important during this period as they were a penalty in a 2–1 away victory against local rivals Chester City on 20 August 2006 and the opening goal in Wrexham's 4–1 League Cup victory at Championship side Sheffield Wednesday on 23 August 2006.

However, in their 2–1 victory against Swindon Town on 9 September 2006, Roberts picked up an injury. He made his comeback in a 2–1 defeat against Milton Keynes Dons scoring the opening goal. However, Roberts suffered more injuries throughout the course of the season. On 21 April 2007 he came on as a second-half substitute in a game against Torquay United and scored his first goal since October 2006 and Wrexham's winning goal to ensure a vital 1–0 win in Wrexham's bid for survival in the Football League Two. He was released by Wrexham in May 2008 following the club's relegation to the Football Conference.

On 24 June 2008, Roberts signed for Welsh Premier League side Rhyl, where he combined playing with coaching opportunities and his business interests. After one season at Rhyl, Roberts left to take over as a project manager at Premier League side Manchester City.

Honours
 Football League Second Division champion, 2002–03
 Welsh Premier League Team of the Year: 2008–09

References

External links

Welsh Premier profile

1978 births
Living people
Footballers from Wrexham
Welsh footballers
Wales international footballers
Wales under-21 international footballers
Wrexham A.F.C. players
Wigan Athletic F.C. players
Hull City A.F.C. players
Doncaster Rovers F.C. players
Bradford City A.F.C. players
Rhyl F.C. players
English Football League players
Cymru Premier players
Association football forwards
Manchester City F.C. non-playing staff